Margaret George may refer to:

Margaret George (born 1943), historical novelist
Margaret George (athlete) (born 1937), Canadian Olympic athlete
Margaret George Shello (1941–1969), Assyrian guerrilla fighter
Margaret H. George (born 1928), American author and former politician
Margaret Lloyd George (1866–1941), first wife of British Prime Minister David Lloyd George